Ross "The Rooster" Hale (born 28 February 1966) born in Bristol is an English amateur, boxing out of National Smelting Company ABC  (Avonmouth), and professional light welter/welter/light middleweight boxer of the 1980s and '90s who won the British Boxing Board of Control (BBBofC) Western Area welterweight title, BBBofC British light welterweight title, and Commonwealth light welterweight title, and was a challenger for the BBBofC British welterweight title against Geoff McCreesh, his professional fighting weight varied from , i.e. light welterweight to , i.e. light middleweight.

References

External links

Image - Ross Hale

1966 births
English male boxers
Light-middleweight boxers
Light-welterweight boxers
Living people
Sportspeople from Bristol
Welterweight boxers